The 3rd Guards Brigade was an infantry brigade of the British Army in World War I. It was formed in France in August 1915 with two battalions already on the Continent and another two from England.  It served with the Guards Division on the Western Front for the rest of the war.

History

Formation
The 3rd Guards Brigade was formed at Lumbres, near St Omer, France on 15 August 1915.  The 4th Battalion, Grenadier Guards and 1st Battalion, Welsh Guards joined on 18 and 20 August, respectively, from England and the 1st Battalion, Grenadier Guards and 2nd Battalion, Scots Guards joined on 5 and 8 August from 20th Brigade, 7th Division.  The latter two battalions had been in Belgium and France from 5 October 1914 with the British Expeditionary Force.  They served on the Western Front in 1914 and 1915 taking part in the First Battle of Ypres (19 October5 November 1914), the Battle of Neuve Chapelle (1013 March 1915), the Battle of Aubers Ridge (9 May), the Battle of Festubert (1519 May), and the Battle of Givenchy (15 and 16 June).

War service
In 1915, the brigade took part in the Battle of Loos (26 September8 October) and Hohenzollern Redoubt (1819 October).  In 1916, it fought in the later stages of the Battle of the Somme, in particular the Battle of Flers–Courcelette (1516 and 2022 September), the Battle of Morval (2528 September), and the Capture of Lesboeufs (25 September). In 1917, it saw action in the Third Battle of Ypres including the Battle of Pilckem Ridge (31 August2 July), the Battle of Poelcappelle (9 October), and the First Battle of Passchendaele (12 October). It then took part in the Battle of Cambrai (24 November3 December).

In February 1918, British divisions on the Western Front were reduced from a 12-battalion to a 9-battalion basis (brigades from four to three battalions). As a result, the 4th Guards Brigade was formed on 8 February 1918 by taking a battalion from each of the brigades of the Guards Division and the 3rd Guards Brigade lost the 4th Battalion, Grenadier Guards.

The latter half of the year of 1918 saw the return of the war of movement.  The 3rd Guards Brigade had to withstand the German spring offensive in the First Battles of the Somme (125 March) then switched over to counter-attack in the Second Battles of the Somme (2123 August), the Second Battle of Arras (26 August3 September), the Battles of the Hindenburg Line (12 September12 October), and in the Final Advance in Picardy including the battles of the Selle and of the Sambre.  Its final action was the Capture of Maubeuge on 9 November.

Post-war
At the Armistice, the brigade was at Maubeuge, and on 17 November it regained 4th Battalion, Grenadier Guards from the disbanding 4th Guards Brigade.  The next day it began the march on Germany and crossed the frontier on 11 December.  By 19 December it had reached the Cologne area.  Battalions started returning to England on 20 February 1919 and the last units had completed the move by 29 April.

Order of battle
The following units served in the brigade:
 1st Battalion, Grenadier Guards
 4th Battalion, Grenadier Guards (joined the 4th Guards Brigade on 8 February 1918, returned on 17 November 1918)
 2nd Battalion, Scots Guards
 1st Battalion, Welsh Guards
 3rd Guards Brigade Machine Gun Company (formed 1–19 September 1915; joined the 4th Battalion, Machine Gun Guards on 1 March 1918)
 3rd Guards Trench Mortar Battery (formed by 24 March 1916)

Commanders
The brigade had the following commanders:

See also

Notes

References

Bibliography

External links
 

Infantry brigades of the British Army in World War I
Guards Division (United Kingdom)
Military units and formations established in 1915
Military units and formations disestablished in 1918